Universidad Católica is an underground metro station on the Line 1 of the Santiago Metro, in Santiago, Chile. It provides access to the Centro Cultural Gabriela Mistral and is named after the Pontifical Catholic University of Chile, whose main administrative offices are housed in a building close to the station. The station was opened on 31 March 1977 as part of the extension of the line from La Moneda to Salvador.

References

Santiago Metro stations
Railway stations opened in 1977
1977 establishments in Chile
Santiago Metro Line 1